FK Rabotnik is a football club based in the city of Bitola, North Macedonia. They currently play in the OFS Bitola league.

History
The club was founded in 1945.

In January 2012, FK Pelister and FK Rabotnik made a co-operation agreement and several players have been loaned between the two clubs.

Honours

 Macedonian Republic League:
Winners (2): 1950, 1951

References

External links
Club info at MacedonianFootball 
Club info at MakFudbal 
Football Federation of Macedonia 

1945 establishments in the Socialist Republic of Macedonia
Rabotnik